Daewoo Shipbuilding & Marine Engineering Co., Ltd (abbreviated DSME) is  one of the "Big Three" shipbuilders of South Korea, along with Hyundai and Samsung.

History
On 21 February 2011, the A. P. Moller-Maersk Group (Maersk) ordered 10 large container ships from DSME, each with a capacity of 18,000 containers, surpassing the then record holder; the Mærsk E-class at 15,200 containers. The contract is worth $1.9bn. The first was to be delivered in 2014. In June 2011, Maersk ordered ten more, for another $1.9bn. The new class is called the Triple E class.

On December 20, 2011, Daewoo Shipbuilding Marine Engineering won the largest single defense contract by a Korean firm; valued at $1.07 billion to build three Indonesian submarines. It also would mark the first exports of submarines from South Korea.

On 22 February 2012, a £452 million order was placed with DSME for four 37,000 tonne double hulled 'MARS' fast fleet tankers by Britain's Ministry of Defence for the Royal Fleet Auxiliary. The ships entered service in 2017.

The firm is building 15 LNG icebreaker/tanker ships commissioned by Yamal LNG which will be used to export liquefied natural gas from the Russian Arctic. Each icebreaker/tanker is designed to operate year-round from the Yamal Peninsula and to break ice up to 2.5 meters thick. The tankers were designed in Finland by Aker Arctic Technology Inc.

The South Korean Board of Audit and Inspection found  of accounting fraud in DSME's books on 15 June 2016. In July, 2016, shares in DSME were suspended from trading, and were announced to be suspended until at least September 28, 2017. After suffering losses of Won3.3tn in 2015 and Won2.7tn in 2016, it was given a  government loan in March 2017 to prevent bankruptcy.

In 2017, it was uncovered that North Korea may have hacked the company and stole company's blueprints in April 2016.

In December 2022, Hanwha Group announced that it would acquire a controlling 49.3 percent stake in Daewoo Shipbuilding & Marine Engineering worth 2 trillion won ($1.5 billion USD). The deal was supported by the Korea Development Bank in an attempt to improve competition in the Korean shipbuilding industry.

Ships built

 container ships
 20 
 11  (Gen2)
 10 of 16 
 8 of 14 
 6 
 5 
 6 of 14 
 23 
 6 
 5 
 submarines
 2 
 8 of 9 
 3 Type 214
 surface naval
 3 of 6 s
 3 s
 4 of 8 s
 3 of 9 s
 1 of 4 s
 other
 5 s

See also
Daewoo dissolution and corruption scandal

References

External links
 

Accounting scandals
Daewoo
Manufacturing companies based in Seoul
Scandals in South Korea
Shipbuilding companies of South Korea
Companies listed on the Korea Exchange
South Korean brands